The Bengali Wikipedia or Bangla Wikipedia is the Bengali language edition of Wikipedia, the free online encyclopedia. Launched on 27 January 2004, it surpassed 10,000 articles in October 2006, becoming the second South-Asian language to do so. On 25 December 2020, the site achieved the milestone of 100k articles. Amazingly, though it joined later compared to top wikipedias, it ranks 5th in terms of article depth among 318 active wikipedias by language. 

As of June 2020, Bengali Wikipedia is the only online free encyclopedia written in Bengali language. It is also one of the largest Bengali content related sites on the internet. The mobile version of Bengali Wikipedia was launched in 2010.

It also has a phonetic Latin alphabet to Bengali script tool so Latin alphabet keyboards can be used to type Bengali without downloading any software. Community-produced news publications include WikiBarta. As in the most Wikipedias of the region, the median age of Bengali Wikipedia's editors is younger than many European Wikipedias.

Statistics 
Between the 12-month period between February 2022 and January 2023, Bengali Wikipedia had at average 346 active editors, and was viewed about 248 million times from all over the world.  

As of January 2023, the largest amounts of pageviews came from Bangladesh, India, United States of America and Saudi Arabia respectively, reflecting the spread of Bengali language and the geographical reach of Bengali speaking immigrants. The article সুভাষচন্দ্র বসু (English: Subhas Chandra Bose) was the most viewed article with the 74,239 page views.

Early history
In February 2002, the developers started creating language-code based sub-domains for different language Wikipedias. Along with other Wikipedia sub-domains, Bengali language sub-domain was created at that time. A placeholder page was created automatically in that sub-domain on 1 June 2002. On 9 December 2003, A Bangladeshi Ph.D. student of Canada's McGill University named Shah Asaduzzaman emailed Wikipedia Founder Jimmy Wales with a request to create Bengali Wikipedia. As a result, the developers created a test page on the Wikipedia named "Home Page" on 26 December of the same year.

The Main Page of Bengali Wikipedia was created on 27 January 2004, from an IP address which marks the official beginning of Bengali Wikipedia. 'বাংলা ভাষা' ("Bānglā Bhāshā"; Bengali Language in English) is the first article of Bengali Wikipedia which was created on 24 May 2004.

History

Bengali Wikipedia started its journey on 27 January 2004. Back then, the Bengali-speaking population had a little interest in Wikipedia. A few students and scholars used the English Wikipedia, but it was not accountable. Besides that, there were various difficulties contributing in Bengali. The whole scenario has been changed in 2006. During that time, the Bengali blogging world was growing slowly, and many people became accustomed to Bengali computing where a free and open-source Bengali typing tool, Avro Keyboard played a key role. On 25 March 2006, a Wiki team was created by the 'Bangladesh Open Source Network' (BdOSN) to popularize Wikipedia throughout the country. The aim was to represent Bengalis to the world through Wikipedia and build a complete encyclopedia in Bengali.

At that time, Bengali Wikipedia had only 500 articles. 'BdOSN wiki team' managed to spread the word through some newspapers and start a Bengali Wiki mailing list. Soon, many Bengali-speaking people from Bangladesh, India and abroad joined them in this dynamic project. As a result, by the end of the October, Bengali Wikipedia got to 10,000 articles. Among the South Asian language Wikipedias, Bengali Wikipedia reached that milestone first, and many of these articles were illustrated with photos from the demonstrator of Bengali Language Movement Dr. Rafiqul Islam, who donated all his historical photographs taken during the language movement to Wikimedia Commons.

One of the pioneers of the Bengali Wikipedia, Dr. Ragib Hasan said that 

The very low activity of Bengali Wikipedia for many years, mostly in the period between 2007 and 2013, can be attributed to the very low number of internet users in Bangladesh, especially in the first decade of the 21st century (in 2010, there were only 556,000 internet users in Bangladesh according to a research). Thus it ranked below many other languages with much fewer speakers, including regional languages of Western Europe.

Between 2009 and 2010, Bengali speakers from West Bengal, India also started to contribute to Bengali Wikipedia. In the meantime, the Wikimedia Foundation started their operations and on 3 October 2011, a local chapter named Wikimedia Bangladesh was approved in Bangladesh by the Foundation to promote educational content in Bengali. On 26 February 2015, Jimmy Wales, the co-founder of Wikipedia—visited Bangladesh for a celebration program that was organized by Wikimedia Bangladesh to mark the tenth year of Bengali Wikipedia. In his keynote, Jimmy said that according to the article depth, Bengali Wikipedia is rated quite well.

Since 2018, Bengali Wikipedia began to experience a very strong growth of articles, as more than 16 thousand articles were written in 2019 and 21 thousand articles in 2020, from just 8.8 thousand articles in 2018. This growth can be attributed from a mixture of successful editathons and the arrival of many prolific contributors.

Bengali Wikipedia now has  articles on various topics with  active editors per month. As of January 2019, Bengali Wikipedia is the only online free encyclopedia written in Bengali language. It is also one of the largest Bengali content related sites on the internet. Statistically, since early 2019, Bengali Wikipedia has recorded significant growth. The number of articles has increased from 63,000 to nearly 101,000 in just two years and the number of active users has increased to above a thousand. The number of edits has also recorded a significant growth.

On 25 December 2020, Bengali Wikipedia reached the milestone of 100,000 articles. Since 2019, the number of active users has remained above 1,000.

Features 
Bengali Wikipedia has nearly 135,000 articles (February 2023). It is having thousands of articles about Bangladesh and India, although it lacks some articles about the latter, and about Europe as well. The main religions of Bengal, Hinduism and Islam, have a good, expanding coverage in Bengali. Most contributors are based in Bangladesh. A fair minority is based in West Bengal, however very few users are based in other Bengali-speaking areas of India or abroad.

The main deficits of Bengali Wikipedia are the content gaps in some articles, and parts of policy pages which are still untranslated, a problem that also appears in other wikis. Bengali Wikipedia's advantages are, among others, strong activity and high amount of editors for its small amount of articles and the expanding coverage on its focus areas (Bangladesh and India). Themes such as women's rights are well-covered in Bengali Wikipedia. Also, thematic editathons take place frequently in Bengali, and have contributed nearly 12,000 articles to Bengali Wikipedia. The pageviews of Bengali Wikipedia are ranging around 18 to 21 million per month, as of October 2022.

As it happens in many other Indic Wikipedias, there is a tendency for active users and pageviews to record significant increase during the monsoon season (June–October). After October, the growth is largely retained, before a new cycle of growth begin at the next June. That process was disrupted due to COVID-19 pandemic in 2020, however, since 2021, there are signs of recovery regarding pageviews, however the number of active users has remained stagnant with a trend of reduction (as in every Indic Wikipedia, particularly Hindi). As of June 2022, Bengali Wikipedia is read approximately 710 thousand times per day, and because of this phenomenon, pageviews increase almost every day. Due to its rapid growth, as described earlier, Bengali Wikipedia has improved its ranking in the list of the largest Wikipedias by number of articles, increasing from the 80th position in January 2019 to the 65th in November 2022.

As of May 2022, Bengali Wikipedia received 12 million pageviews in Bangladesh, 4 million pageviews from India. Small amounts of pageviews are coming from United States and from Gulf states, where there are sizable Bengali-speaking migrant communities. It is Bangladesh's second most popular language version of Wikipedia, behind English, but in India it doesn't receives more than the 1% of the Wikipedia pageviews in this country.

The significant amount of people which live under the poverty line in Bangladesh (20.5% as of 2019) and lower penetration of internet in Bangladesh and India are among the factors that can be attributed for the still low number of articles in Bengali. Also, another reason to blame is generally the socioeconomic context of Bangladesh and West Bengal as a whole.

Users and editors

Controversies
Over the years, there has been confusion in Bangladeshi media regarding some information of Bengali Wikipedia. In April 2018, Bangladeshi print and electronic media reported that Wikipedia named Runa Laila, a renowned singer from Bangladesh, among its Top 30 Bengali people of all time. This confusion arises due to the use of a collage image in the Bengalis article's infobox at Bengali and English version of Wikipedia. In August of the same year, an unregistered user added a fake date of death in Muhammed Zafar Iqbal's article, which also attracted media attention.

Gallery

See also 
 History of Wikipedia
 Reliability of Wikipedia
 Wikipedia community

References

External links 

 Bengali Wikipedia 
 Bengali Wikipedia mobile
 
 
 Bengali Wikipedia in Wikiscan. Wikiscan is website that provides real-time and other statistics for Wikimedia wikis.

2004 establishments in Bangladesh
Internet properties established in 2004
Wikipedias by language
Bengali encyclopedias
Bangladeshi encyclopedias